Isobel Mary Redmond (born 8 April 1953) is a former Australian politician who was the member for the electoral district of Heysen in the House of Assembly from 2002 to 2018. She was the parliamentary leader of the South Australian Division of the Liberal Party of Australia and the Leader of the Opposition in the Parliament of South Australia between 2009 and 2013, and was the first female leader of a South Australian state major party. Under Redmond, the Liberals won 18 of 47 seats in the South Australian House of Assembly at the 2010 election, a gain of three from the 2006 election. She resigned as leader of the Liberal Party on 31 January 2013.

Early life
Redmond attended Heathcote High School on the outskirts of Sydney, graduating in 1971. In the 1970s she was briefly a member of the Labor Party.

In the late 1970s Redmond and her husband Jim moved to Stirling in the Adelaide Hills. After receiving the winnings of a lottery ticket from her parents she set up her own legal firm.  She also worked with Jay Weatherill and Patrick Conlon at Duncan Basheer in the early 90s.

Redmond was also elected to Stirling Council in 1982, and in 1999 was elected as the first female president of the Stirling Rotary club.

Parliament
Redmond won the electoral district of Heysen in the South Australian House of Assembly at the 2002 state election and from 2004 held various shadow ministries. She is linked to the conservative Evans family faction within the Liberal Party's South Australian division.

Redmond became deputy leader of the Liberal Party on 4 July 2009 after party leader Martin Hamilton-Smith called a leadership and deputy leadership spill. Hamilton-Smith retained the leadership, with Redmond replacing Vickie Chapman as deputy leader. Hamilton-Smith called a second leadership spill after a close 11–10 vote, and a few days later did not nominate for the leadership position. On 8 July 2009, Redmond was elected leader against Chapman by a 13–9 vote. Steven Griffiths was elected deputy leader by an 8–6 vote against Mitch Williams. He stepped down from the deputy leadership after the 2010 election to be replaced by Hamilton-Smith.

The dodgy documents affair, known as "Dodgy-gate", ultimately saw the downfall of Hamilton-Smith. The issue resurfaced with revelations that Redmond had been "a central figure in a strategy meeting in Mr. Hamilton-Smith's office the day the documents were used against the government". It was alleged that she had been shown the documents and the accompanying questions, and gave approval for their use, based on information that the documents came from a Labor source. Hamilton-Smith later admitted that was not true.

Redmond led the Liberals into the 2010 election, becoming the first woman to take a major party in the state into an election.  Despite winning a slender majority of the two-party-preferred vote, the Liberals only won 18 of 47 seats in the South Australian House of Assembly, an increase of three from the 2006 election. This was mainly due to a failure to make significant inroads in Adelaide, which has long tilted toward Labor at the state level. While all three Liberal gains were in Adelaide, the party only won six other seats in the capital, including Redmond's.

After the 2006 election, the state Boundaries Commission drew an electoral map that theoretically have seen Labor lose government on a uniform 6.9 percent swing. This would have translated to a seven-seat gain for the Liberals on paper—more than enough to make Redmond South Australia's first female premier. However, while the Liberals picked up a swing of 8.4 percent, much of that swing came in comfortably safe Labor seats. Additionally, Labor actually picked up swings in their favour in their two most marginal seats, Light and Mawson. With this in mind, when the Boundaries Commission convened in 2012, Redmond and the Liberals pressed for boundaries based solely on the 2010 result—which would have potentially given the Liberals a notional majority. In the end, the Commission decided that the 2007 boundaries were fair, even though they didn't result in the party winning a majority of the two-party vote winning government.

On behalf of the SA Liberals, Redmond backed premier Mike Rann's support for same-sex marriage in October 2011. She joined all state Labor leaders and, later on a personal basis only, the LNP's Campbell Newman, in support of marriage equality.

Redmond came under mounting internal party and media pressure her performance during the 2010 election and she suffered dwindling poll ratings during the period of the Weatherill government. Controversially, Redmond confirmed that she had said in answer to a question that the best way to deal with workplace gender discrimination was to ignore it. She also backed unsuccessful candidate and SA Liberal Party director Bev Barber to replace Mary Jo Fisher in the Senate, even considering replacing Fisher herself. As well, she threatened to sue the Liberal Party in 2006 over a five percent levy on Liberal MP salaries introduced by Iain Evans to fund election campaigns. Her announced intention to cut of a quarter of the public service if she won government, was subsequently said was not to be Liberal Party policy. She also refused to confirm speculation that she had offered the state Liberal leadership to former federal Liberal leader Alexander Downer.

On 19 October 2012, her predecessor as opposition leader, Martin Hamilton-Smith, announced he would be challenging Redmond for the parliamentary leadership of the South Australian Liberal Party. Deputy leader Mitch Williams was challenged by Steven Marshall. At the ballot on 23 October, Redmond retained the leadership by one vote, but Marshall was elected to the deputy leadership.

Redmond resigned as the leader of the Liberal Party on 31 January 2013, citing the need to end "ongoing leadership speculation and disunity" as the primary factor in her decision. Steven Marshall was chosen to replace her.

Redmond suffered a swing against her at the 2014 election in Heysen on the primary, two-party and two-candidate vote, and faced the SA Greens after preferences. The two-party swing against her was 3 points, while some booths recorded two-party swings against her of up to 8 points.

Redmond used parliamentary privilege on 20 May 2014 to claim that the Electoral Commission of South Australia's head commissioner Kay Mousley was "utterly corrupt" following the 2014 election result. Facing a potential privileges committee investigation and a request to substantiate or withdraw the remarks, she withdrew her remarks and apologised on 5 June 2014. In response to Mousley's announcement in May 2015 that she would step down after a decade of service, Redmond remarked "hooray".

On 18 January 2017, Redmond announced that she would be retiring from parliament at the 2018 state election.

Personal life
Redmond is (no longer) married to American teacher Jim Redmond with whom she has had three children, all now adults. She resides in the town of Stirling in the Adelaide Hills.

See also
Women and government in Australia
Women in the South Australian House of Assembly

References

External links
 IsobelRedmond.com.au official website
 
 

|-

|-

|-

1953 births
Liberal Party of Australia members of the Parliament of South Australia
Living people
Members of the South Australian House of Assembly
Leaders of the Opposition in South Australia
Politicians from Sydney
21st-century Australian politicians
21st-century Australian women politicians
Women members of the South Australian House of Assembly